The 2004–05 FA Cup Qualifying Rounds opened the 124th season of competition in England for 'The Football Association Challenge Cup' (FA Cup), the world's oldest association football single knockout competition. A total of 661 clubs were accepted for the competition, up 17 from the previous season’s 644.

The large number of clubs entering the tournament from lower down (Levels 5 through 11) in the English football pyramid meant that the competition started with six rounds of preliminary (2) and qualifying (4) knockouts for these non-League teams. South Western Football League was the only level 11 league represented in the Cup, five clubs from the South Western Football League were the lowest-ranked clubs in competition. The 32 winning teams from Fourth qualifying round progressed to the First round proper, where League teams tiered at Levels 3 and 4 entered the competition.

Calendar

Extra preliminary round
Matches played on Saturday/Sunday 28 to 29 August 2004. 146 clubs from Level 9, Level 10 and Level 11 of English football, entered at this stage of the competition, while other 203 clubs from levels 9-11 get a bye to the preliminary round.

Preliminary round
Matches played on weekend of Saturday 4 September 2004. A total of 364 clubs took part in this stage of the competition, including the 73 winners from the Extra preliminary round, 203 clubs from Levels 9-11, who get a bye in the extra preliminary round and 88 entering at this stage from the four divisions at Level 8 of English football. The round featured three clubs from Level 11 (all from the South Western Football League) still in the competition, being the lowest ranked clubs in this round.

First qualifying round
Matches on weekend of Saturday 18 September 2004. A total of 248 clubs took part in this stage of the competition, including the 182 winners from the Preliminary round and 66 entering at this stage from the top division of the three leagues at Level 7 of English football. Bodmin Town and St Blazey from the South Western Football League at Level 11 of English football were the lowest-ranked clubs to qualify for this round of the competition.

Second qualifying round
Matches played on weekend of Saturday 2 October 2004. A total of 168 clubs took part in this stage of the competition, including the 124 winners from the first qualifying round and 44 Level 6 clubs, from Conference North and Conference South, entering at this stage. The round featured six clubs from Level 10 still in the competition, being the lowest ranked clubs in this round.

Third qualifying round
Matches played on weekend of Saturday 16 October 2004. A total of 84 clubs took part, all having progressed from the second qualifying round. Cammell Laird from Level 10 of English football were the lowest-ranked club to qualify for this round of the competition.

Fourth qualifying round
Matches played on weekend of Saturday 30 October 2004. A total of 64 clubs took part, 42 having progressed from the third qualifying round and 22 clubs from Conference Premier, forming Level 5 of English football, entering at this stage. The round featured five clubs from Level 9 still in the competition, being the lowest ranked clubs in this round.

Competition proper
See 2004–05 FA Cup for details of the rounds from the first round proper onwards.

External links
 Football Club History Database: FA Cup 2004–05
 The FA Cup Archive

FA Cup qualifying rounds
Qual